Emperor Theodore (or Fedor, Theodoros, et cetera) may refer to:

Feodor I of Russia, son of Ivan the Terrible
Feodor II of Russia, son of Boris Godunov
Feodor III of Russia, older brother of Peter the Great
Theodore I Laskaris, a Byzantine emperor
Theodore II Laskaris, a Byzantine emperor
Tewodros I of Ethiopia
Tewodros II of Ethiopia